Ernakulam–Kayamkulam coastal line is a railway line which runs along the coastal areas of Alappuzha, Ernakulam districts in Kerala state of India. The coastal railway line starts as a branch line from Ernakulam Junction railway station towards Alappuzha and joins with the route via Kottayam ( Ernakulam-Kottayam-Kayamkulam line) at Kayamkulam Junction. This is the only main track in Kerala yet to be doubled and the single line traffic causes major delays in the route.

History
The initial survey for the Ernakulam–Kayamkulam line via Alappuzha was started in 1975. The initial proposed alignment of the railway line from Ernakulam Junction to Alappuzha has been changed after protests from various quarters. This line was mentioned in 1977-78 final budget. The final alignment of the route which was approved was Ernakulam–Konthuruty–Nettor–Kumbalam–Aroor–Cherthala–Alappuzha. The construction of railway line was started on 15 April 1979 and the construction has been divided into two reaches as Ernakulam–Alappuzha reach and Alappuzha–Kayamkulam reach.

Ernakulam–Alappuzha section

The construction of this coastal railway line in Ernakulam Junction–Alappuzha railway station section was started in 1979. Construction of Alleppey-Ernakulam new B.G. Railway line has been included in the budget for 1979-80, with a proposed outlay, of Rs. 1 crore in the coming financial year 1979-80.
Around 140 hectares of land was acquired for laying the railway lines. 11 new railway stations and 6 major bridges have been constructed along this route. The line was opened to railway traffic on 16 October 1989.

Alappuzha–Kayamkulam section
The construction of Alappuzha–Kayamkulam section was started as part of second phase of coastal railway development and the alignment was via Alappuzha–Punnapra–Ambalappuzha–Haripad–Kayamkulam. Thus, the Ernakulam Junction–Alappuzha coastal railway line has been connected to Kayamkulam Junction railway station–Kollam Junction main railway line.

Stations
There are 18 stations along this route. Alappuzha, Cherthala, Haripad, and Ambalappuzha stations are the major stations along this route.

Electrification and track doubling 
Ernakulam Junction–Alappuzha–Kayamkulam railway line is fully electrified. The double line work on  Kayamkulam–Haripad section has been completed and the double line track was commissioned in January 2012. The track doubling work for Haripad– Ambalapuzha was also commissioned. Hence there is a double line from Kayamkulam to Ambalapuzha. Doubling of the  Long Aroor Bridge has started in 2019. 

The doubling works for the Ambalapuzha- Ernakulam junction sector is painfully slow. There is not even a sign of any earth works or anything happening in this stretch at present.
However, as of June 2021, The Railways has sanctioned an additional Rs 510 crore for acquiring land for the doubling of the line from Ernakulam to Thuravoor

Rail traffic
The Ernakulam–Alappuzha–Kayamkulam coastal line has 20 express trains and 7 passenger trains running along this route.

There is also freight traffic through this line.

Needed development 

 A bypass line connecting Cochin Harbour Terminus railway station line with Alappuzha line near Kochu Kadavanthra and Thevara. It will help decongest Ernakulam Junction railway station and help start more south bound trains via Alappuzha.
 Timely completion of doubling of line and improvement of signalling in a manner such that headway will be minimum. This will help start Kollam - Alappuzha - Kochi suburban trains. 
 Building a connection between Aroor Halt and Kanjiramattom on Ernakulam–Kottayam–Kayamkulam line so that a circular suburban rail network can be developed around Kochi. And decongest Ernakulam yard.
 This line is devoid of any high degree curves and hence is suitable for upgradation of permissible speeds upto 130kmph. Currently the two fastest trains in the state namely Jan Shatabdi Express and Rajdhani Express passes through this line with speeds above 90 kmph at certain reaches.
 Replacement of major level crosses in the section with flyovers. Especially on Haripad - Mavelikkara, Ambalapuzha - Thiruvalla, Cherthala - Arthunkal,  Haripad - Edathua roads. 
 Development of infrastructure, amenities and last mile connectivity to stations along the line.

See also
Kayamkulam Junction
Alappuzha railway station
Ernakulam–Kottayam–Kayamkulam line
Sabarimala Railway
Kollam–Sengottai Chord Line

References

Transport in Alappuzha district
Tourist attractions in Alappuzha district
Rail transport in Kerala
†
5 ft 6 in gauge railways in India
Transport in Ernakulam district
Transport in Kottayam district
1989 establishments in India
Transport in Kollam district
Transport in Kochi